Silver Box is a 5-CD box set by Scottish rock band Simple Minds, released in October 2004. It includes Our Secrets Are the Same (as disc 5), the band's long-delayed (1999/2000) twelfth studio album of original material.

Overview 
Silver Box is mostly made up of previously unreleased demos, BBC sessions and various live recordings from 1979 to 1995. It also includes, as a final bonus disc, their genuine twelfth studio album (of original material), Our Secrets Are the Same. Originally recorded between April and June 1999 and originally planned to be released on its own in early 2000, Our Secrets Are the Same was delayed many times and even cancelled until its final inclusion in the box set.

Critical reception 
The few professional reviews the compilation received commented on the previously elusive album Our Secrets Are The Same positively. Adam Sweeting, writing for The Guardian newspaper, opined, "The album, dating from 1999, was scuppered by legal wranglings, but it's some of the best music the band have made in 20 years. Tracks such as "Death by Chocolate" or "Happy Is the Man" recall something of their old pioneering spirit, and show a fascination with the process of recording rather than with prancing about in front of a sea of cigarette lighters." He dismissed most of the third and fourth discs as evidence of the band's progression into "overblown" stadium rock, but admitted: "If you chucked out most of discs three and four from this beefy five-disc box, you'd be left with some fascinating insights and lost nuggets from the past and near-present of Simple Minds. Rob Fitzpatrick writing for the NME agreed, saying, "By CD3, "Waterfront" – a neat throb of a single – is bloated into ten-plus minutes of pointless noodling and "Ghost Dancing" is so clearly similar in sound to U2's "The Unforgettable Fire" it's embarrassing. By CD4 it's time for "Belfast Child". God no! Miraculously, though, CD5 the band's 1999 'lost' album has some really good music on it in fact it's a lost gem that some fans have never heard or even know about.

Uncut meanwhile admitted that the new album would be the main source of interest, but thought that the music still owed much to U2, writing, "It finds Kerr and Burchill still a bit in the slipstream of '90s U2 – tastefully epic, techno-fringed and extravagantly exasperated ("Death By Chocolate" and "Neon Cowboys") with the wickedness of a world gone wrong." Martin C. Strong meanwhile, in The Essential Rock Discography, complimented the band's new music: "The album's savvy pop smarts harked back to their early 80s purple period, only underlining the shortcomings of Néapolis, while the sassy momentum of "Jeweller to the Stars" could've easily regenerated Kerr and Co's contemporary credibility."

Track listing
Adapted from the box set liner notes.

Silver Box (November/2004. Virgin Records)

Disc 1

Disc 2

Disc 3

Disc 4

Disc 5: Our Secrets Are the Same

Personnel
Credits adapted from the box set liner notes, except where noted.

Musicians
Jim Kerr – vocals
Charlie Burchill – guitar
Mick MacNeil – keyboards (disc 1; disc 2; disc 3: 1-8)
Derek Forbes – bass (disc 1; disc 2: 1-11)
Brian McGee – drums (disc 1; disc 2: 1-4)
Kenny Hyslop – drums (disc 2: 5, 6)
Mike Ogletree – drums (disc 2: 7-9)
Mel Gaynor – drums (disc 2: 10-12; disc 3: disc 4: 1-10)
John Giblin – bass (disc 2: 12; disc 3: 1-8)
Robin Clark – vocals (disc 3: 1-7)
Sue Hadjopoulos – percussion (disc 3: 1-7)
Malcolm Foster – bass (disc 3: 9,10; disc 4)
Mark Taylor – keyboards (disc 3: 9,10; disc 4)
Mark Schulman – drums (disc 4: 11-13)
Bono – vocals (disc 2: 11)
Technical
Trevor Dann – producer (disc 1: 4-7)
John Owen Williams – producer (disc 2: 5,6)
John Sparrow – producer (disc 2: 7-10)
Nick Gomm – engineer (disc 1: 4-7)
Mike Robinson – engineer (disc 2: 5-10)
Simon Heyworth – mastering (disc 1-5)

Our Secrets Are the Same
Jim Kerr – vocals
Charlie Burchill – guitar, keyboards, producer, mixing 
Kevin Hunter – guitar, backing vocals, producer 
Eddie Duffy – bass, additional percussion 
Mark Kerr – drums, backing vocals 
Chris Fudurich – additional keyboards, engineer, mixing 
Recorded April–June 1999 at CaVa Studios in Glasgow and Jim Kerr's house.

References 

2004 compilation albums
Simple Minds compilation albums
Virgin Records compilation albums
2004 live albums
Demo albums
Virgin Records live albums